Goleh-ye Chah or Galah Chah or Galeh Chah may refer to:
 Galah Chah, Sistan and Baluchestan
 Goleh-ye Chah, Nehbandan, South Khorasan Province
 Galeh Chah, Sarayan, South Khorasan Province